Tatyana Sergeyevna Shibanova (born 10 November 1994) is a Russian ice hockey player, currently playing with Buz Beykoz SK of the Turkish Kadınlar Ligi. She represented  at the 2015 IIHF Women's World Championship, alongside her twin sister Anna.

References

1994 births
Living people
Russian women's ice hockey forwards
Sportspeople from Omsk
Twin sportspeople
Russian twins
HC Agidel Ufa players
20th-century Russian women
21st-century Russian women